Bay du Vin is a small but picturesque unincorporated community located on the south shore of Miramichi Bay, 24 km east of the former town of Chatham (now a part of Miramichi), New Brunswick, Canada. It is suggested that its name comes from a corruption of the French "Baie de Vents" meaning "Bay of Winds" rather than the widely supposed "Bay of Wine" in the literal translation.

History

The community is reputed to be the oldest European settlement in Northumberland County, New Brunswick, having been established by French settlers from St. Malo, France in 1672. They established their community along the south shore of Miramichi Bay, just east of Gardiners Point. With some of the deepest water along Miramichi Bay, Bay du Vin was one of the most important early settlements in the region. Eventually there were close to fifteen buildings and a chapel, later destroyed by English settlers.

English destroyed the village during the Gulf of St. Lawrence Campaign (1758) of the expulsion before crossing the bay to do the same to Burnt Church. The area was later settled by the Irish and English.

Bay du Vin had the first regional high school with both academic and vocational training in the province. It was established by the Reverend Douglas Smith, but was phased out in 1966 and eventually replaced by Miramichi Rural School.

The community today

The area is known to be rich in smelts, oyster beds, Atlantic salmon and cranberries. It is a very pretty area with the Willistons being one of the more noted family names. A well known lumberman, Luther Williston, son of a loyalist, once had a stone colonial house located there; it still stands today. Bay du Vin also has great sand bars that are perfect for clam digging.

Notable people

See also
List of communities in New Brunswick

References

Communities in Northumberland County, New Brunswick